DIN 1025 is a DIN standard which defines the dimensions, masses and sectional properties of hot rolled I-beams.

The standard is divided in 5 parts:
 DIN 1025-1: Hot rolled I-sections - Part 1: Narrow flange I-sections, I-serie - Dimensions, masses, sectional properties
 DIN 1025-2: Hot rolled I-beams - Part 2: Wide flange I-beams, IPB-serie; dimensions, masses, sectional properties
 DIN 1025-3: Hot rolled I-beams; wide flange I-beams, light pattern, IPBl-serie; dimensions, masses, sectional properties
 DIN 1025-4: Hot rolled I-beams; wide flange I-beams heavy pattern, IPBv-serie; dimensions, masses, sectional properties
 DIN 1025-5: Hot rolled I-beams; medium flange I-beams, IPE-serie; dimensions, masses, sectional properties

See also
 EN 1993

1025
Structural engineering standards
Structural steel